Courteenhall is a village  south of the county town of Northampton, in the shire county of Northamptonshire, England, and about  north of London. The population of the civil parish was 122 at the 2011 census. The village is located in a cul-de-sac.

Governance
The village is in South Northamptonshire, and is part of Blisworth and Roade ward. It is within the Northamptonshire County Council area. From the 2010 general election it is in the new parliamentary constituency of South Northamptonshire (previously Northampton South).

Location
The M1 motorway between junctions 14 and 15 passes to the northeast of the village, and junction 15 is just 1 mile distant. The main part of the village is on a no-through route. Courteenhall Parish has its own independent Parish Meeting which usually meets twice a year.  It shares a rector with Roade, Ashton, Collingtree and Hartwell.

Facilities
The parish had a population of less than 100 in 2003, has no facilities other than a church and relies on the nearby village of Roade for shops, schools and other services. The post office in Courteenhall, which opened in 1883, closed in February 1996.

History
The villages name origin is uncertain. 'Corta's/Curta's nook of land' or 'nook of the enclosed piece of land'.

Church of St Peter and St Paul
The church dates from the 12th century. It is now part of "The Five Parishes" group of local churches together with Roade, Collingtree, Ashton and Hartwell. The former Rectory is next to the south side of the church. The church has some memorable tombs. The 1851 ecclesiastical census revealed that 100 people, out of a total population of 127, attended Courteenhall Church on census day. The Rectory next to the church dates from 1805.

The Hall
The village has developed around the Courteenhall House estate. The estate was purchased from Richard Ouseley by Samuel Jones, the son of a London merchant, in 1647. Samuel was knighted in 1660, was High Sheriff of Northamptonshire for 1652–53 and died in 1673. His estates were inherited by his great-nephew Samuel Wake, a younger son of Sir William Wake, 3rd Baronet of Piddington. The Wake family is reputedly descended from Hereward the Wake, a Saxon hero of resistance to the Norman conquest of England. The park was designed in 1791 by Humphry Repton sic for Sir William Wake, 9th Baronet. The Hall, like the park, dates from 1791 on a site selected by Repton and is by a little-known architect Samuel Saxon. It is private property but may be viewed in the distance from Courteenhall village church. Although sheep graze over the grounds of the main park, they are kept out of the Hall's garden by a ha-ha. Courteenhall House is still occupied by the Wake family, the head of which being Sir Hereward Charles Wake, 15th Baronet.

The Stables and School House

Built around 1750 in the Palladian style and contrast with the house. There is also in the grounds the former Free Grammar School House of about 1680, under the will of Sir Samuel Jones containing its original school furnishings including a raised seat for the school master.

Visitors
The venue is rarely open to the public but is available for private hire. It is at the end of a narrow cul-de-sac road and has very limited parking. Visitors are advised to park outside the village and use one of the many public footpaths for access. Parking during the fête is via the main drive from the A508 Northampton to Milton Keynes road only.

Biennial fête
A large biennial fête is held during June in even-numbered years, which is an opportunity to see the house (exterior only), and grounds including an extensive arboretum. The event raises several thousand pounds for the upkeep of the church, parts of which are over 800 years old.

Notable people
 Sir Richard Lane (1584–1650) Chief Baron of the Exchequer and Lord Keeper of the Great Seal to Charles I
 Joan Wake (1884–1974), historian

References

External links

South Northants District Council
Northamptonshire County Council

Villages in Northamptonshire
Buildings and structures in Northamptonshire
History of Northamptonshire
Tourist attractions in Northamptonshire
Country houses in Northamptonshire
West Northamptonshire District